Albert Monks may refer to:
 Albert Monks (footballer, born 1875), English football inside forward for Blackburn Rovers, Bury and Glossop
 Albert Monks (footballer, born 1903), English football goalkeeper for Rochdale

See also
 Albert Monk, Australian trade unionist